This article contains several lists of ambassadors from China. The incumbents change from time to time; sometimes a post starts or stops being temporarily headed by a lower ranking diplomat. Occasionally, a post is created or abolished.

In accordance with articles 67 and 81 of the Constitution of the People's Republic of China, ambassadors are selected by the Standing Committee of the National People's Congress and officially appointed by the President of the People's Republic of China.

Current Chinese Ambassadors
Ambassador information is primarily taken from the Ministry of Foreign Affairs ambassador information pages. In certain cases, the information is taken from the relevant embassy website.

Ambassadors to international organizations
Current ambassadors from the People's Republic of China to international organizations

Ambassadors-at-large
Current ambassador-at-Large from the People's Republic of China with worldwide responsibility

See also

Foreign relations of China
List of diplomatic missions of China

Notes and references

External links

Diplomatic Figures

 
 
China diplomacy-related lists
China